Reimis Smith (born 13 May 1997) is a New Zealand professional rugby league footballer who plays as a  and er for the Melbourne Storm in the NRL.

He previously played for the Canterbury-Bankstown Bulldogs in the National Rugby League and has played for New Zealand 9s at international level.

Background
Smith was born in Sydney, New South Wales, Australia, and is of Māori and Indigenous Australian descent. Smith is the son of former New Zealand international Tyran Smith, and the nephew of boxer and former professional rugby league footballer Anthony Mundine.

Smith played his junior rugby league for the Mascot Jets and for the South Sydney Harold Matthews team. He was educated at Matraville Sports High School and then being signed by the Parramatta Eels in 2013.

Playing career

Early career
In 2015, Smith played for the Parramatta Eels' NYC team, before joining the Canterbury-Bankstown Bulldogs mid-season.

2016 - 2020: Canterbury Bankstown Bulldogs

On 7 May, Smith played for the Junior Kiwis against the Junior Kangaroos. In Round 12 of the 2016 NRL season, he made his NRL debut for Canterbury against Canberra, scoring two tries. He had played for the clubs Intrust Super Premiership NSW side the day before, but due to regular Canterbury centre Josh Morris being called up to the New South Wales State of Origin side on the day of the NRL game, Smith was called up and had to drive from Sydney to Canberra to make the game.

Smith spent 2017 playing for Canterbury's NSW Cup team, making no appearances for the first-grade team. On 6 May, Smith again played at centre for the Junior Kiwis against Junior Kangaroos in the 46-22 loss at Canberra Stadium.

in 2018, following the mid-season departure of Moses Mbye to the Wests Tigers, Smith earned a recall back into Canterbury's first-grade team on the wing as Will Hopoate shifted from centre to fullback to fill in the void. He made his first appearance of the season in Round 15 against the Gold Coast Titans, playing on the wing. In Round 24 against the St George Illawarra Dragons, Smith scored a hat-trick of tries in Canterbury's shock upset 38-0 win at Jubilee Oval. He finished the season with 11 matches and 7 tries. On 3 September, he was selected in the New Zealand Kiwis training squad but didn’t make the final 24-man squad. On 3 October, Smith extended his contract with Canterbury to the end of the 2020 NRL season.

In Round 8  of the 2019 NRL season against Manly-Warringah, Smith scored two tries in a 18-10 defeat at Brookvale Oval.  In Round 19, Smith scored two tries in a 20-12 loss against the Sydney Roosters at ANZ Stadium.

In Round 23 against arch rivals Parramatta, Smith was placed on report and then sent to the sin bin in the second half of the match after headbutting Parramatta player Maika Sivo during Canterbury's upset 12-6 victory at the Western Sydney Stadium.

On 11 November, Smith signed a contract extension to stay at Canterbury until the end of the 2021 season.

Smith played 14 games for Canterbury in the 2020 NRL season scoring four tries.  The club finished in 15th place on the table, only avoiding the Wooden Spoon by for and against over bottom side Brisbane. On 13 November, Smith was granted a release by Canterbury to join reigning premiers, Melbourne.

2021 - Present: Melbourne Storm
Smith played a total of 25 games for Melbourne in the 2021 NRL season as the club won 19 matches in a row and claimed the Minor Premiership.  Smith played in two finals matches including the preliminary final where Melbourne suffered a shock 10-6 loss against eventual premiers Penrith.

In round 9 of the 2022 NRL season, Smith was taken from the field during Melbourne's victory over St. George Illawarra.  It was later announced Smith would miss 10–12 weeks with a torn pectoral injury.

References

External links

 Canterbury Bulldogs profile (Archived on 26 October 2020)

1997 births
Living people
Australian people of Māori descent
Australian rugby league players
Bundjalung people
Canterbury-Bankstown Bulldogs players
Indigenous Australian rugby league players
New Zealand Māori rugby league players
Melbourne Storm players
Junior Kiwis players
Rugby league wingers
Rugby league centres
Rugby league players from Sydney
Wiradjuri people